Russell Greene (born 30 May 1957) is a former Australian rules footballer who played for the St Kilda Football Club and Hawthorn Football Club in the Victorian Football League (VFL).

After playing eight games with St Kilda in 1980, he joined  for the rest of that season and was a key player during a successful decade for the club. He won the VFL Players Association Most Valuable Player award, now known as the Leigh Matthews Trophy, as well as Hawthorn's best and fairest honours in 1984. Greene was chosen in the All-Australian team in 1985. Greene's last game was the 1988 grand final win over Melbourne.

Greene has been involved at a few different clubs over the years, in 1994 at North Melbourne, Greene was the fitness advisor, a position he also held in 1997 at St. Kilda.

Since retiring from football, Greene has worked as a PE teacher, first at Melbourne Grammar, and currently (2011 – present) at Marnebek School in Cranbourne.

References

Holmesby, Russell and Main, Jim (2007). The Encyclopedia of AFL Footballers. 7th ed. Melbourne: Bas Publishing.

Living people
1957 births
Australian rules footballers from Victoria (Australia)
Hawthorn Football Club players
Hawthorn Football Club Premiership players
St Kilda Football Club players
Leigh Matthews Trophy winners
Peter Crimmins Medal winners
All-Australians (1953–1988)
Victorian State of Origin players
Australia international rules football team players
Three-time VFL/AFL Premiership players